Charles Eber "Chic" Stone (January 4, 1923 – July 28, 2000) was an American comic book artist best known as one of Jack Kirby's Silver Age inkers, including his landmark run of Fantastic Four.

Biography

Early life and career
Chic Stone studied at the School of Industrial Art (later renamed the High School of Art and Design), and the Works Projects Administration School. He broke into comics in 1939, at age 16, apprenticing with the comic-book packager Eisner & Iger. In the 1940s, he worked on the original Captain Marvel for Fawcett Comics, and Boy Comics for Lev Gleason Publications. For Timely Comics, the 1940s predecessor of Marvel Comics, he contributed to Blonde Phantom Comics, "Eustis Hayseed" in Joker Comics; and "Jeep Jones" in All Select Comics and Kid Komics.

Silver-Age Stone
Stone largely left comics during the 1950s to become an art director for magazines including True Experience and The American Salesman, and to publish a magazine, Boy Illustrated, which folded after two issues. He did commercial art for Grey Advertising and TV commercial storyboards for Filmack Studios. Stone, at this time living in Hollywood, California, then became art director of Modern Teen and Dig Magazine. At unspecified points, he did art for magazines including Esquire and Mechanics Illustrated, and was publisher and art director of Boy Illustrated.

He returned to comic books during the 1960s Silver Age, initially with the small American Comics Group (ACG) on titles including Adventures into the Unknown, for which he would pencil from 1962-1967. He also variously penciled and inked, uncredited, for DC Comics, and occasionally ghosted for artists Bob Kane (on Batman stories) and George Papp (inking his Superboy pencils).

Shortly thereafter, Stone began inking industry legend Jack Kirby's pencils on Fantastic Four (issues #28-38, Annual #2). He also inked Kirby on early issues of X-Men and the feature "Thor" in Journey into Mystery, and the two artists collaborated on covers across the spectrum of Marvel's comics.

Of his pairing with Kirby, Stone recalled in a 1997 interview,

Cartoonist Fred Hembeck, describing Stone as "my favorite Kirby inker", said that "beyond the bold and expressive line Stone's varied brushwork brought to Jack's power-packed pencils, the sheer fact that, by year's end, he was inking the King on Fantastic Four, Avengers, X-Men, and the Thor and Captain America features in their respective home titles gave the entire line a warm and homey sense of visual cohesiveness that it's never quite managed to achieve since."

Later in the decade, Stone returned to freelancing for DC Comics, penciling an occasional Batman story — including the lead tale in the anniversary-issue Batman #200 (March 1968). He additionally pencilled numerous stories for Tower Comics' T.H.U.N.D.E.R. Agents, Dynamo and NoMAN.

Other work around this time includes a run of the character Nemesis in ACG's Forbidden Worlds and Unknown Worlds; Dell Comics' Flying Saucers, and a Garrison's Gorillas TV tie-in comic; and early-1970s work for Skywald Publications' black-and-white horror magazines Psycho and Nightmare. Stone's art for an AMT model car-kit ad ("Grandpa Munster 'Digs' The Drag-U-La!") appeared in DC's Superman's Girl Friend, Lois Lane #64 (April 1966), and elsewhere.

Later career
In the late 1970s and 1980s, Stone began a long association with Archie Comics, including its Red Circle and Archie Adventure Series superhero lines. This work includes a story written by future Marvel editor-in-chief Tom DeFalco in Archie's Super Hero Special #2 (Aug. 1979), and Stone's inking of fellow Silver Age veteran Dick Ayers on a Black Hood story in Blue Ribbon Comics #11 (Aug. 1984). Stone also worked on the regular Archie teen-humor line.

Stone was inking for Marvel as late as The A-Team #1 (March 1984). In the early 1990s, he drew commissioned art in Silver Age Kirby-Stone style for sales through dealers.

Comics artist Jimmy Palmiotti recalled, 

Stone died in 2000 in Autauga County, Alabama.

Audio
Audio of Merry Marvel Marching Society record, including voice of Chic Stone

References

External links
 

1923 births
2000 deaths
Artists from New York City
Golden Age comics creators
Silver Age comics creators
Marvel Comics people
High School of Art and Design alumni